Luiz Henrique dos Santos Júnior (born 17 January 1998), commonly known as Luiz Henrique, is a Brazilian footballer who plays as left back for Bahia, on loan from Juventus-SC, he can also play as a left winger.

Career statistics

Honours
Brusque
 Copa Santa Catarina: 2019

Mirassol
 Campeonato Brasileiro Série D: 2020

Londrina
 Campeonato Paranaense: 2021

References

External links

1998 births
Living people
Sportspeople from Salvador, Bahia
People from Bahia
Brazilian footballers
Association football defenders
Campeonato Brasileiro Série A players
Campeonato Brasileiro Série B players
Campeonato Brasileiro Série D players
Grêmio Foot-Ball Porto Alegrense players
Esporte Clube Cruzeiro players
Grêmio Esportivo Juventus players
Brusque Futebol Clube players
Atlético Clube Goianiense players
Mirassol Futebol Clube players
Londrina Esporte Clube players
Esporte Clube Bahia players